Christmas Time, Christmas time or Christmastime may refer to:
 Christmastide
 The Christmas and holiday season

Music
 Christmas Time (Boney M. album), 2008
 Christmas Time (Marcos Witt album), 2005
 Christmas Time (Wendy Moten album), 1995
 "Christmas Time" (Bryan Adams song), 1985
 "Christmas Time" (Backstreet Boys song), a 1996 song by the Backstreet Boys
 "Christmas Time", a song by Christina Aguilera from the album My Kind of Christmas
 "Christmas Time", a song by ALO from the album This Warm December, 2008
 "Christmas Time", a song by Ray Charles from the album The Spirit of Christmas
 "Christmas Time (Don't Let the Bells End)", a 2003 single by The Darkness
 "Christmas Time (Is Here Again)", a 1967 song by The Beatles
 "Christmastime", a song by Aimee Mann from the album One More Drifter in the Snow
 "Christmastime", a song by The Smashing Pumpkins from the album A Very Special Christmas 3
 "Christmastime", a song by Stevie Wonder from the album Someday at Christmas
 Christmastime (Bob Schneider album), 2009
 Christmastime (Michael W. Smith album), 1998
 Christmastime (The Swingle Singers album), 1968
 Christmastime!, a 2004 album by Don McLean

See also
 Advent
 Christmas season (disambiguation)
 The Christmas Island Time zone (UTC+07:00)